"And Get Away" is a song written by Gilbert Moorer and Bill Sheppard and performed by The Esquires. It reached #9 on the US R&B chart and #22 on the Billboard Hot 100 in 1967.  The song was featured on their 1967 album, Get on Up and Get Away.

The song was produced by Bill Sheppard.

References

1967 songs
1967 singles
The Esquires songs